Times-Advocate may refer to:

The Daily Times-Advocate, also known as the Escondido Times-Advocate, a newspaper published in Escondido, California from 1909 to 1995
The Exeter Times-Advocate, a newspaper published in Exeter, Ontario
The Advocate (Louisiana), sometimes referred to as the State Times-Advocate, a newspaper published in Baton Rouge, Louisiana
The Gregory Times-Advocate, a newspaper published in Gregory, South Dakota
The Edwards County Times-Advocate,  a newspaper published in West Salem, Illinois
The Taloga Times-Advocate, a weekly newspaper published in Taloga, Oklahoma

See also
The Advocate (disambiguation)
The Times (disambiguation)